An election for Members of the European Parliament from Estonia to the European Parliament was held on 25 May 2014.

Opinion polls 

1 Not running independently in the elections.
2 Not running in the elections.
3 As People's Union of Estonia

Results

Elected Members of the European Parliament
 Andrus Ansip (Estonian Reform Party) (Replaced by Urmas Paet on 3 November 2014)
 Yana Toom (Estonian Centre Party) 
 Tunne-Väldo Kelam (Union of Pro Patria and Res Publica)
 Marju Lauristin (Social Democratic Party)
 Indrek Tarand (independent)
 Kaja Kallas (Estonian Reform Party)

See also
2014 European Parliament election
Politics of Estonia
List of political parties in Estonia

References

External links
National Electoral Committee
European Parliament Election Act

Estonia
European Parliament elections in Estonia
2014 in Estonia